Robert Graham Heiner (1901–1977) was a 20th-Century American law partners of Cahill, Gordon, Reindel & Ohl and president of Planned Parenthood of New York City.

Background

Heiner was a Phi Beta Kappa graduate of Johns Hopkins College (as was Alger Hiss).  In 1923, as a Rhodes scholar, he obtained a degree in law from Oxford University.

Career

Private practice

Heiner joined the law firm of Cotton & Franklin.  He became a partner and specialized in securities and international finance.

During World War II, he served as assistant general counsel in the U.S. Lend‐Lease Administration.

Hiss Case

By August 1948, Heiner had joined Cahill, Gordon, Reindel & Ohl.  He was second pick for lead attorney by Alger Hiss, following allegations by Whittaker Chambers earlier that month that Hiss had been a member of the Ware Group Soviet network. First pick and fellow Baltimore lawyer and childhood friend William L. Marbury Jr. was in Geneva for a month to help negotiate the GATT.  Hiss wrote Marbury to this effect on August 31, 1948.  The letter documents that Hiss was trying to retain Heiner as of August 13 for his executive session with HUAC on August 16.  Before that second hearing by Hiss, Heiner and colleague Jerry Doyle had advised him that their firm ("Cahill, Gordon") could not represent Hiss, as they faced possible "conflict with another government interest."  As a result, Hiss had no counsel then and to scramble to find counsel for "Confrontation Day" (August 25).  Hiss managed to latch onto John F. Davis, recently returned to private practice and formerly an SEC lawyer and fellow ‘’Harvard Law Review’’ member (who continued on the Hiss defense).

Cases he worked included United States v. Morgan, 118 F. Supp. 621 (S.D.N.Y 1953).

In 1962, he retired from Cahill, Gordon, Reindel & Ohl.

Planned Parenthood

In 1963, Heiner joined the national board of the Planned Parenthood Federation and served until 1968.  In 1972, he joined as president of the New York chapter of Planned Parenthood and served until 1974.

At time of death, he was a trustee of the Erhman and Schimper foundations and had served previously as a trustee of Knickerbocker Hospital.

Personal and death

Heiner had been a friend of Margaret Sanger.

He married twice.  His first wife, Frances Eliot Cassiday, died in 1958.  His second wife, Nina King Colgate, survived him.  He had two children by his first wife.

He died of leukemia on July 22, 1977, at the Memorial Sloan‐Kettering Cancer Center, aged 76.

See also
 Planned Parenthood
 Cahill Gordon & Reindel
 Alger Hiss

References

New York (state) lawyers
1901 births
1977 deaths
American birth control activists
American nonprofit executives
American socialists
American women's rights activists
People associated with Planned Parenthood
Progressive Era in the United States
People associated with Cahill Gordon & Reindel
20th-century American lawyers